is a Japanese manga series written and illustrated by Hazano Kazutake. It has been serialized in Kodansha's Shōnen Magazine R online magazine since April 2017, with its chapters collected into eleven tankōbon volumes as of December 2022. An anime television series adaptation by Doga Kobo is set to premiere in July 2023.

Characters

Media

Manga
Written and illustrated by Hazano Kazutake, Saint Cecilia and Pastor Lawrence began serialization in Kodansha's Shōnen Magazine R online magazine on April 20, 2017. On January 20, 2023, the series was transferred to the Monthly Maga Kichi website after the disbandment of Shōnen Magazine R. As of December 2022, eleven tankōbon volumes have been published. In North America, Kodansha USA has licensed the series for English digital publication.

Volume list

Anime
An anime television series adaptation was announced in June 2022. It will be produced by Doga Kobo and directed by Sumie Noro, with scripts written by Yuka Yamada, character designs handled by Hiromi Nakagawa, and music composed by Ruka Kawada. The series was initially scheduled for April 2023, but was later delayed to July due to the COVID-19 pandemic affecting the production. Crunchyroll licensed the series.

Reception
Reviewing the manga's first volume, Rebecca Silverman from Anime News Network praised its art, but had mixed feelings with the storyline, calling it "funny and sweet at times," while criticizing the lack of tension.

See also
 The Angel Next Door Spoils Me Rotten, light novel series whose first volume was illustrated by Hazano Kazutake

References

External links
  
  
 

2023 anime television series debuts
Anime postponed due to the COVID-19 pandemic
Anime series based on manga
Aniplex
Crunchyroll anime
Doga Kobo
Fantasy anime and manga
Kodansha manga
Romantic comedy anime and manga
Shōnen manga
Upcoming anime television series